The Romanian hamster or Dobrudja hamster (Mesocricetus newtoni) is a species of rodent in the family Cricetidae. It is found in Bulgaria and Romania.

Description
The Romanian hamster has brown dorsal (back) fur and a white underside. The top of the head has a dark stripe that extends to the neck. The dark cheek stripes extend back to the shoulder.

Behavior
The Romanian hamster is a nocturnal or crepuscular species. It lives solitarily in a complex burrow system. It eats seeds, legumes, rooted vegetables, and grasses, but also insects. It transports its food with its elastic cheek pouches to the food chambers. They reach sexual maturity when 56–70 days old and breed through early April to August. The common hamster has a gestation of 15 days, gives birth to a litter of 1–12 and weans after three weeks of pregnancy. It communicates by squeaking or with ultra-sound. Both sexes flank mark by rubbing their glands against objects.

References

Musser, G. G. and M. D. Carleton. 2005. Superfamily Muroidea. pp. 894–1531 in Mammal Species of the World a Taxonomic and Geographic Reference. D. E. Wilson and D. M. Reeder eds. Johns Hopkins University Press, Baltimore.

Mesocricetus
Mammals described in 1898
Taxonomy articles created by Polbot